The  Cosmopolitan Soccer League is a regional soccer league consisting of semi-pro and amateur teams based in and around New York City.  Established in 1923, it is one of the oldest soccer leagues in the United States and has contributed greatly to the nation's soccer history.

Currently, the league has four open divisions. The first two divisions require all clubs to also field reserve teams, a requirement that some leagues have abolished, but which the Cosmopolitan Soccer League believes makes its competition some of the strongest in United States soccer. The league also has an over-30 and an over-40 division. The league is USASA-affiliated.

The Cosmopolitan Soccer League plays a traditional international schedule with competition beginning the second weekend of September and running through June, with a winter break from late December to early March. During the winter months, the league runs an indoor tournament due to New York's cold climate.

History
The Cosmopolitan Soccer League was formed as the German American Soccer League in 1923. In 1927, the association changed its name to the German American Football Association.  The league was highly successful in the 1920s and, in New York, was behind only baseball and basketball in terms of popularity. The league struggled through the Great Depression and by the 1940s the game was viewed by most Americans as an "ethnic" sport. Attendance and popularity declined sharply until the founding of the North American Soccer League in 1968. By the mid-1970s, league officials recognized that in order to maintain the league's viability in the same market as the star-studded New York Cosmos, it needed to appeal to a wider audience and in 1977, it voted to change its name to the Cosmopolitan Soccer League. Prior to the professionalizing of the modern American game, the United States national team often consisted of Cosmopolitan League players.

In 1923, five teams, S.C. New York, Wiener Sports Club, D.S.C. Brooklyn, Hoboken FC 1912 and Newark S.C., banded together to found the German American Soccer League.  As the name suggests, the teams were largely composed of recent immigrants from Central Europe, primarily Germany.  The next year, four more teams, Swiss F.C., Elizabeth S.C., S.C. Eintracht and Germania S.C., joined the league.  The league renamed itself the German American Football Association in 1927.  While the GASL began as a single division league, it added a junior division in 1933.  That year, the league also held its first indoor tournament.  In addition to its junior division, the GASL also added several lower divisions over the decades.

In 1943, all of the U.S. leagues suffered from significant player losses from the U.S. participation in World War II.  In order to continue to play a competitive schedule, the GASL joined with the Eastern District Soccer League to run a joint season.  Following the end of the war in 1945, the GASL found itself turning from a lack of quality players to an overabundance as Central European professionals left their war ravaged countries to move to the United States.  The league experienced a second influx of talented players when Hungarians fled their country following the Soviet Union crushing the 1956 Hungarian Revolution.

In 1964, the GASL joined with the professional American Soccer League in a short lived experiment.  That year, the two leagues formed the Eastern Professional Soccer Conference which competed during the GASL/ASL off season.  The league was a failure and did not complete its one season in existence.  While the merger with the ASL was less than successful, the GASL undertook a cooperative agreement with another league, this time the International Soccer League (ISL) in 1965.  That season, the GASL All Star team entered the ISL as the New Yorker, going to the final where it lost to Polonia Bytom 5–1.  The string of league mergers continued in 1974 when the National Soccer League of New York merged into the GASL.

In 1977, the GASL changed its name in response to a changing American soccer scene.  While soccer had existed as an ethnic sport since the 1930s, the creation of the North American Soccer League in 1968 had brought the sport into the mainstream.  Recognizing that maintaining its ethnic identity would hinder its acceptance by the wider U.S. sports culture, the GASL governing board voted to rename the league the Cosmopolitan Soccer League.  As part of this process, the league’s teams were directed to change their names to ones with less ethnic connotations, although this requirement was dropped three years later.

Despite the regional and semi-professional nature of the league, it featured many of the top U.S. player in the 1950s and 1960s.  Even into the early 1970s, GASL players appeared regularly with the U.S. national team.  The high regard afforded to the league is reflected in that the National Soccer Hall of Fame considers the GASL as one of a handful of leagues in which a player may become eligible for entry into the Hall of Fame.

New York Cosmos
The GASL had named an All Star team beginning in 1930.  In 1968, after the newly established North American Soccer League approached the GASL about placing a GASL team in the NASL, the league formed its All Star team, known as the Cosmos, into an exhibition team.  The Cosmos did not enter the NASL until the 1971 season, but when it did, it was well stocked with former GASL players.

2020–2021 team list 
List of the participants in the current season: The top former CSL teams play in the Eastern Premier Soccer League, which together with Maryland Major Soccer League, created a regional based multi-league promotion and relegation system between these leagues.

Eastern Premier Soccer League 

 Doxa SC
 FC Westchester
 KidSuper Samba AC
 Lansdowne Yonkers FC
 NY Athletic Club
 NY Greek Americans
 NY Pancyprian-Freedoms
 Sporting Astoria SC (now known as New Amsterdam FC II-SASC)
 Zum Schneider FC 03

Division 1 

 Beyond FC
 Hoboken FC 1912
 Kelmendi FC NY
 Manhattan Celtic
 Manhattan Kickers
 NY Greek Americans II
 NY Shamrocks SC
 Polonia NY SC
 Real Olé FC
 Richmond County FC
 Stal Mielec NY
 Zum Schneider FC 03 II

Division 2  
 Block Espanol
 Borgetto FC
 Central Park Rangers FC Reds
 DeSportiva Sociedad NY
 FC Japan
 FC Sandzak
 Flushing FC
 KidSuper Samba AC II
 Missile FC
 NY Ukrainian SC
 S.C. Eintracht
 Williamsburg International F.C.
 NY International F.C.

Division 3  
 Aurora FC
 Barnstonworth Rovers FC
 Brooklyn City FC
 CD Iberia
 Central Park Rangers FC Blacks
 DeSportiva Sociedad NY City
 FC Partizani NY
 KidSuper Samba AC II
 Laberia FC
 Lansdowne Yonkers FC Metro
 Mola SC - MOLAMERICA
 NY Galicia
NY Greek Americans Over-30
 NY Pancyprian-Freedoms II
NY Pancyprian-Freedoms Over-30
 NYC Afghanistan FC
 Panatha USA
 Ridgewood Romac SC
Sport Vereniging Yellow Hook
 Tibet FC

Division 4 
 Brooklyn City FC
 Brooklyn Bound SC
 DeSportiva Sociedad NY Metro
 FC Partizani NY
 Guyana Veterans
 MetroAcademy
 NY Croatia
 Sons of Queens
Sporting SC Over-30

Over 40 Division 
America FC 1927
Barnstonworth Rovers Old Boys
Central Park Rangers Legends
Cozmoz FC
Doxa SC Legends
Manhattan Celtic Masters
Manhattan Kickers Legends
NY Irish Over-40
SC Eintracht Legends
SC Gjoa
Sporting SC Over-40

Inactive Clubs 
 Elizabeth S.C.
 Union County SC

Past League Champions 

 Both Elizabeth S.C. and New York Hota/Bavarian SC hold the title of champion for the 1970–1971 season

Year by year 

Source

CSL in national competitions

National Challenge Cup
 1951  German-Hungarian SC
 1955  S.C. Eintracht
 1962  NY Hungaria
 1965  NY Ukrainian SC
 1967  Greek American AA
 1968  Greek American AA
 1969  Greek American AA
 1970  Elizabeth S.C.
 1971  NY Hota
 1972  Elizabeth S.C.
 1974  Greek American AA

National Amateur Cup
 1929  DFC Newark (runner up)
 1936  DSC Brooklyn
 1944  S.C. Eintracht
 1949  Elizabeth S.C.
 1951  German-Hungarian SC

McGuire Cup (U-19 National Cup)
 1936  Hatikvoh FC
 1937  Hatikvoh FC
 1952  Killsman SC
 1953  Newark SC
 1955  Blau-Weiss Gottschee SC
 1959  NY Ukrainian SC

See also 

 Soccer in New York City
 Eastern New York State Soccer Association

References 
Notes

External links 
Cosmopolitan Soccer League
 League history
 Manhattan Kickers
 List of champions
 Historical Standings

 
Soccer leagues in the United States
1923 establishments in New York (state)
Sports leagues established in 1923
Regional Soccer leagues in the United States